Stephanie W. Elkins (born  1963) is an American former competition swimmer who won a gold medal in the 4×100-meter freestyle relay at the 1978 World Aquatics Championships, setting a new world record.  She won another gold medal in the same event at the 1979 Pan American Games.  She qualified for the 1980 Summer Olympics, again in the 4×100-meter freestyle, but could not participate due to the boycott of the Moscow Olympics led by the United States.

Elkins attended Stanford University, and swam for the Stanford Cardinal swimming and diving team in National Collegiate Athletic Association (NCAA) competition.  She graduated from Stanford with a bachelor's degree in organizational behavior, and since 1985 worked in sale and leasing of office and R&D buildings.  She was a vice president of Colliers International. /she now works at Coldwell Banker Residential real estate teaming with Hugh Cornish in luxury properties in Atherton/Portola Valley/Woodside and Menlo Park

See also
 List of World Aquatics Championships medalists in swimming (women)
 World record progression 4 × 100 metres freestyle relay

References

1963 births
Living people
American female freestyle swimmers
Stanford Cardinal women's swimmers
Swimmers at the 1979 Pan American Games
World Aquatics Championships medalists in swimming
Pan American Games gold medalists for the United States
Pan American Games medalists in swimming
Medalists at the 1979 Pan American Games